General Motors used the Cadillac SLS nameplate for the following vehicles:
 The fourth generation Cadillac Seville, produced from 1992-1997
 The fifth generation Cadillac Seville, produced from 1998-2004
 The first generation Cadillac STS, produced in China from 2006-2013

SLS